The 1952–53 İstanbul Football League season was the 43rd season of the league. Fenerbahçe SK won the league for the 13th time.

Season

References

Istanbul Football League seasons
Turkey
1952–53 in Turkish football